is a Japanese former synchronized swimmer who competed in the 1988 Summer Olympics, where she gained a bronze medal each for the solo and duet events, and the 1992 Summer Olympics.  She was the first woman to be Japan's flag-bearer for the 1988 Summer Olympics Opening Ceremony.

Retirement
Since retiring, Mikako Kotani has opened a synchronized swimming school and served on the JOC (Japanese Olympic Committee), IOC Athletes' Commission, and Association of National Olympic Committees.  In 1997, she introduced the resolution to promote Olympic truce to the United Nations General Assembly.  In 2013, she was chosen to present the proposed venue layout for Tokyo's successful bid to host the 2020 Summer Olympics.

As of September 2017, she is currently a director on the board for the JOC and Olympians Association of Japan.  In addition, she is on the executive committee of the World Olympians Association.

See also
 List of members of the International Swimming Hall of Fame

References

1966 births
Living people
Japanese synchronized swimmers
Olympic synchronized swimmers of Japan
Synchronized swimmers at the 1988 Summer Olympics
Synchronized swimmers at the 1992 Summer Olympics
Olympic bronze medalists for Japan
Olympic medalists in synchronized swimming
World Aquatics Championships medalists in synchronised swimming
Synchronized swimmers at the 1986 World Aquatics Championships
Synchronized swimmers at the 1991 World Aquatics Championships
Medalists at the 1988 Summer Olympics